The Amsterdam Kill is a 1977 film directed by Robert Clouse. It stars Robert Mitchum and Richard Egan.

Plot
Former DEA Agent Quinlan, removed from the force some years earlier for stealing confiscated drug money, is hired by Chung Wei, a leader in the Amsterdam drug cartel, who wants out of the business. Quinlan's job is to use Chung's information to tip DEA agents to drug busts, thereby destroying the cartel. But when the first two "tips" go awry, resulting in murdered DEA officers, the feds must decide whether to trust Quinlan further.

Cast
Robert Mitchum as Quinlan
Richard Egan as Ridgeway
Leslie Nielsen as Riley Knight
Bradford Dillman as Odums
Keye Luke as Chung Wei
George Cheung as Jimmy
Mars
Lam Ching-ying as Police Officer
Yuen Biao
Yuen Wah

Critical reception
Janet Maslin of The New York Times said the film "... has all the weariness of a genre movie but none of the comfortable familiarity. In a misguided attempt to appeal to an international audience, the film flits from London to Hong Kong to Amsterdam. ... There are so many shots of airports and train terminals that it begins to seem as if one has purchased a Eurail pass rather than a movie ticket. The film is so intent on taking place everywhere that its nervous geography becomes terribly jarring."

References

External links

1977 films
Films directed by Robert Clouse
Columbia Pictures films
1970s English-language films
English-language Hong Kong films
Golden Harvest films
1970s Hong Kong films